The Hydropsychidae are a family-level taxon consisting of net-spinning caddisflies.  Hydropsychids are common among much of the world's streams, and a few species occupy the shorelines of freshwater lakes.  Larvae of the hydropsychids construct nets at the open ends of their dwellings which are responsible for their "net-spinning caddisfly" common name.

Larvae
The hydropsychid larval stage, like most Trichoptera larvae, is spent entirely in fresh water.  They construct dwellings known as "retreats", which are fixed to the sides of rocks.  These retreats are typically composed of collected plant and mineral fragments.  At the large open end of their retreats, hydropsychids spin a net or sieve made of fine silk, similar to the silk produced by the larval form of the Lepidoptera (caterpillars), one of their close relatives.  These nets catch algae, detritus, and smaller invertebrates.  Different genera spin nets of different mesh sizes and shapes depending on what food type they are targeting. Because of this technique of food collection, hydropsychids require flowing water to ensnare items of food into their nets.

Hydropsychids are capable of performing a defensive stridulation in their larval stages.  Individuals stridulate to dissuade other hydropsychids from attempts to steal their retreats.  When individuals abandon, or become dislodged from, their retreats, they must build or seize a new retreat.  "Home-less" hydropsychids will sometimes search out retreats currently occupied by another member of their species.  This can result in a confrontation between individuals, each vying for ownership of an established retreat.  Stridulating warns foes that a retreat is occupied and attempting to enter is unwise.  This noise is made by running their femurs across ridges on the undersides of their heads.  It is still unclear whether this noise is also used to dissuade insect predators.

Anatomy

Hydropsychid larvae are unique from most Trichoptera due to their fully scleritized dorsum.  Only the Hydroptilidae family share this characteristic with the hydropsychids.  This feature combined with branched gills running along ventral surface of their abdomens differentiate the hydropsychids from all other trichopterans.  The hydropsychids have large anal prolegs equipped with hooks, allowing them to grasp the side of rocks in river and stream beds.  Individuals are easily identified without the use of a lens by their large, curved bodies. In India four subfamilies (Arctopsychinae, Martynov 1924, Diplectroninae, Ulmer 1951, Hydropsychinae, Curtis 1835, Macronematinae, Ulmer 1905) have been reported so far which includes 15 genera and 128 species.

Environmental indicators
Due to hydropsychid's presence in a wide range of rivers and streams worldwide, it has been favored as an indicator species.  Some genera, sensitive to certain contaminants or pollutants, suffer declines in growth and/or survival. Thus, like a canary in a coal mine, researchers can examine stream hydropsychid populations to assess stream health (see EPT or Index of biological integrity).

References

Trichoptera families
Taxa named by John Curtis